Prolita sexpunctella, the long-horned flat-back or groundling, is a moth of the family Gelechiidae. It is found in most of Europe and North America.

The wingspan is 13–17 mm. The terminal joint of palpi is as long as second. Forewings dark reddish-brown, suffused with dark fuscous towards base and termen in disc; five fasciae of white irroration, first basal, produced along dorsum, second at 1/4, curved, third central, fourth somewhat inwards.curved, fifth slender, terminal ; stigmata dark fuscous, first discal above plical. Hindwings slightly over 1, fuscous..

Adults are on wing from May to June. They are day-flyers.

The larvae feed on the leaves of Calluna species (including Calluna vulgaris), Empetrum nigrum and Dryas octopetala. They spin the leaves together and overwintering within.

References

External links
UKmoths
Image

Prolita
Moths of Europe
Moths described in 1794